The 2016 Moselle Open was a men's tennis tournament held in Metz, France and played on indoor hard courts. It was the 14th edition of the Moselle Open, and part of the ATP World Tour 250 series of the 2016 ATP World Tour. It was held at the Arènes de Metz from 19 September to 25 September 2016. Third-seeded Lucas Pouille won the singles title.

Singles main-draw entrants

Seeds

 1 Rankings are as of September 12, 2016.

Other entrants 
The following players received wild cards into the singles main draw:
  Julien Benneteau
  Quentin Halys
  Tommy Robredo

The following players received entry from the singles qualifying draw:
  Grégoire Barrère
  Nikoloz Basilashvili
  Peter Gojowczyk
  Vincent Millot

Withdrawals 
Before the tournament
  Carlos Berlocq →replaced by  Jan-Lennard Struff
  Marcel Granollers →replaced by  Dustin Brown
  Philipp Kohlschreiber →replaced by  Íñigo Cervantes
  Guido Pella →replaced by  Pierre-Hugues Herbert
  Jo-Wilfried Tsonga (left knee injury) →replaced by  Ivan Dodig

Doubles main-draw entrants

Seeds 

 Rankings are as of September 12, 2016

Other entrants 
The following pairs received wildcards into the doubles main draw:
  Grégoire Barrère /  Albano Olivetti
  Jürgen Melzer /  Dominic Thiem

Finals

Singles 

  Lucas Pouille defeated  Dominic Thiem, 7–6(7–5), 6–2

Doubles 

  Julio Peralta /  Horacio Zeballos defeated  Mate Pavić /  Michael Venus,  6–3, 7–6(7–4)

External links
Official Website